Speedster (styled SPEEDSTER) is the third studio album by Japanese boy band Generations from Exile Tribe. It was released on March 2, 2016. It was number one on the Oricon weekly Albums Chart on its release, with 71,380 copies sold. It was also number one on the Billboard Japan Hot Albums chart and also on the Billboard Japan Top Album Sales chart.

Track listing

Charts

References

Japanese-language albums
2016 albums
Avex Group albums